The High Note is a 2020 American comedy-drama film directed by Nisha Ganatra and written by Flora Greeson. It stars Dakota Johnson, Tracee Ellis Ross, Kelvin Harrison Jr., Zoë Chao, Bill Pullman, Eddie Izzard, and Ice Cube, and follows a famous singer's personal assistant who wants to become a music producer.

It was released in selected theaters and through Premium VOD on May 29, 2020, by Focus Features. It received mixed reviews from critics, although the cast was praised.

Plot 
Maggie Sherwoode is the longtime personal assistant to legendary R&B singer Grace Davis, who still has a successful touring career despite not releasing new material for a decade. Also an aspiring music producer, Maggie remixes Grace's songs in her free time. Grace's egocentric manager, Jack Robertson, believes that her time has passed and she should accept a Las Vegas residency and release live albums rather than record new material.

At a grocery store, Maggie meets aspiring musician David Cliff, watching him perform outdoors. He invites her to a party at his house, where to her surprise she learns that despite slumming it as a musician he is quite wealthy. Impressed by his voice, she lies about being a professional producer and offers to work with him on an album. He accepts and they begin work together with Maggie coaching him through his nerves.

Grace is displeased when a famous music producer modernizes one of her songs, remixing it with excessive synths and pop elements. Appalled, Maggie shows Grace her own version of the song, and Grace releases Maggie's version, without payment or credit. While pleased to be producing for her, Jack pulls her aside to reveal how her tactlessness ruined potential future deals. When Grace later expresses her interest in recording a new album to her record label, they discourage her, pushing her towards the Vegas residency. Maggie encourages Grace to disregard the label and create new material but Grace lectures her on how women of her age and race rarely succeed in music.

Maggie and David begin a romance as recording for his demo comes to a close. At the same time, she learns that Ariana Grande has backed out of opening for Grace's album launch. She initially books Dan Deakins to open for Grace before realizing it would be the perfect place for David to perform his songs. She enlists Dan's assistant to help but is surprised when Dan himself, after listening to David's songs, decides to step away to allow him to perform.

On the night of the party, Maggie tells Jack and Grace that Dan has backed out and promises to fix it. She then asks David, who believed they were going on a date, to sing. Hearing that the party is for Grace Davis, David leaves in a huff, refusing to perform. Maggie tells Jack and Grace she was unable to deliver a backup performer and Grace berates her, mocking her ambitions to become a producer when she cannot even succeed as an assistant before firing her.

Maggie moves back home with her father Max, a radio DJ, and starts planning her future. After encouragement from her father, she reaches out to David to continue work on their album and to Grace to thank her for her time working for her. At the same time, Grace realizes that she misses Maggie who was a faithful assistant who never used her.

Grace arrives at Maggie's home and offers a roundabout apology. After complimenting her production work on the live album, she reveals that she has never worked with a female producer before but wants Maggie to be the first, also telling her that she has begun writing new material. While Grace is singing for her, David arrives. Before Maggie can introduce them, he reveals that Grace is his estranged mother, something she has kept from the public. He also tells her that Dan Deakins has been passing around his material leading him to an offer of representation from a studio.

Later, David performs at a music festival. He asks Grace to join him on stage, revealing she is his mother, and they sing a duet as Maggie watches. Later in the studio, Maggie produces Grace's new album.

Cast
 Dakota Johnson as Maggie Sherwoode
 Tracee Ellis Ross as Grace Davis
 Kelvin Harrison Jr. as David Cliff
 Zoë Chao as Katie
 Ice Cube as Jack Robertson
 Jonathan Freeman as Martin
 June Diane Raphael as Gail
 Deniz Akdeniz as Spencer Cliff
 Bill Pullman as Max
 Eddie Izzard as Dan Deakins
 Diplo as Richie Williams
 Eugene Cordero as Seth
 Marc Evan Jackson as Alec
 Neil Lane as himself
 Melanie Griffith as Tess

Production
Flora Greeson's screenplay, then titled Covers, was featured in the 2018 Black List, compiling the year's best unproduced scripts. In February 2019, it was announced Nisha Ganatra would direct the film, and that Tim Bevan and Eric Fellner would produce it under their Working Title Films banner. In May 2019, it was announced that Dakota Johnson, Tracee Ellis Ross, Kelvin Harrison Jr. and Zoë Chao had joined the cast, and Ice Cube and June Diane Raphael were added in June. Bill Pullman, Eddie Izzard and Diplo eventually joint the cast as well.

Principal photography began in May 2019 around Los Angeles. In February 2020 the film was re-titled The High Note.

Soundtrack
The High Note soundtrack was released on May 29, 2020, through Republic, Universal. The lead single, "Love Myself" by Ross, was released on May 15.

Release
The High Note was originally scheduled for a wide theatrical release on May 8, 2020, but due to movie theater closures beginning in mid-March, due to the COVID-19 pandemic, it was cancelled.

The film made $87,800 from 50 theaters (mostly drive-ins) in its opening weekend. In its third weekend it made $59,000 from 64 theaters, for a running total of $293,000. By June 28, it had grossed $420,000 in the United States. It was also released in several countries with relaxed COVID-19 theater restrictions, including South Korea, the Netherlands and France, and grossed $1.7 million as of August 28.

Reception

VOD sales
In its opening weekend, The High Note was the second-most rented film on FandangoNow, third-most from the iTunes Store, and 11th-most on Amazon Prime Video. In its second weekend it fell to fourth on FandangoNow and 10th on iTunes, but ranked second on Spectrum. It remained in the top 10 on all services in its third weekend. After lowering its rental price, it returned to the #10 spot on FandangoNow and Apple TV in mid-July.

Critical response
The site's critics consensus reads, "The High Note doesn't quite soar above rom-com formula, but audiences seeking some comfort viewing should find themselves solidly in harmony with this well-acted genre entry." On Metacritic, the film has a weighted average score of 58 out of 100, based on 34 critics, indicating "mixed or average reviews".

Writing for Forbes, Scott Mendelson gave the film a positive review, writing: "It's leisurely-paced, relatively grounded and rooted in the specific pleasures of watching good actors play nice people who deal with their specific conflicts as nicely as possible."

Owen Gleiberman of Variety said the film "can't decide if it's a behind-the-music-industry drama or a go-for-your-dream fairy tale" and that "the feel-good factor hovers over this movie like a fuzzy bland cloud."

The Guardian ranked The High Note 47th in its list of "50 best films of 2020 in the US".

Awards 
 Drama Movie by People's Choice Awards (nominated)
 Drama Movie Star by People's Choice Awards - Tracee Ellis Ross (nominated)

References

Notes

External links

Review and Download The Nigh Note Review, jun 12 2020

2020 films
2020 comedy-drama films
American comedy-drama films
Films produced by Tim Bevan
Films produced by Eric Fellner
Films scored by Amie Doherty
Working Title Films films
Focus Features films
Films directed by Nisha Ganatra
Films about music and musicians
2020s English-language films
2020s American films
2020s French films